Europe Day is a day celebrating "peace and unity in Europe" celebrated on 5 May by the Council of Europe and on 9 May by the European Union.

The first recognition of Europe Day was by the Council of Europe, introduced in 1964. The European Union later started to celebrate its own European Day in commemoration of the 1950 Schuman Declaration which first proposed the European Coal and Steel Community, leading it to be referred to by some as "Schuman Day" or "Day of the united Europe". Both days are celebrated by displaying the Flag of Europe.

History

The Council of Europe was founded on 5 May 1949, and hence it chose that day for its celebrations when it established the holiday in 1964.

The "Europe Day" of the EU was introduced in 1985 by the European Communities (the predecessor organisation of the EU). The date commemorates the Schuman Declaration of 9 May 1950, put forward by Robert Schuman, which proposed the pooling of French and West German coal and steel industries. This led to the creation of the European Coal and Steel Community, the first European Community, established on 18 April 1951.

A "raft of cultural icons" was launched by the European Commission in 1985, in reaction to the report by the ad hoc commission "for a People's Europe" chaired by Pietro Adonnino. The aim was to facilitate European integration by fostering a Pan-European identity among the populations of the EC member states. The European Council adopted "Europe Day" along with the flag of Europe and other items on 29 June 1985, in Milan.

Following the foundation of the European Union in 1993, observance of Europe Day by national and regional authorities increased significantly. Germany in particular has gone beyond celebrating just the day, since 1995 extending the observance to an entire "Europe Week" centered on 9 May.

Observance of 9 May as "Europe Day" was reported "across Europe" as of 2008. In 2019, 9 May became an official public holiday in Luxembourg each year, to mark Europe Day. The EU's choice of the date of foundation of the European Coal and Steel Community rather than that of the EU itself established a narrative in which Schuman's speech, concerned with inducing economic growth and cementing peace between France and Germany, is presented as anticipating a "vocation of the European Union to be the main institutional framework" for the much further-reaching European integration of later decades.

The European Constitution would have legally enshrined all the European symbols in the EU treaties, however the treaty failed to be ratified in 2005, and usage would continue only in the present de facto manner. The Constitution's replacement, the Treaty of Lisbon, contains a declaration by sixteen members supporting the symbols. The European Parliament "formally recognised" Europe Day in October 2008.

Celebrations and commemorations

Open Doors Day 
The EU institutions open their doors to the public every year in Brussels and Strasbourg, allowing citizens to visit the places where decisions impacting their day-to-day lives are made. Moreover, many of these organize commemorative events to honor the historical importance of the date.

The bodies that choose to make this symbolic gesture are:

 European Parliament (EP)
 Council of the European Union 
 European Commission (EC) 
 European Economic and Social Committee (EESC)
 The European Committee of the Regions (CoR) 

In 2020 and 2021, due to the COVID-19 pandemic and the consequent inability to host physical events, the EU institutions organized virtual acts to pay tribute to all those Europeans who were collaborating in the fight against the pandemic. Furthermore, 2020 marked the 70th anniversary of the Schuman declaration and the 75th anniversary of the end of the Second World War. Given the occasion, the above mentioned EU institutions launched several online events to commemorate the importance of the date.

Legal recognition
Europe Day is a public holiday for employees of European Union institutions. In 2019, it was declared a public holiday in Luxembourg, and is also a public holiday in Kosovo. It is a "memorial day" in Croatia, which is a legally-recognised day, but is not a public holiday; a legally-recognised commemorative day in Lithuania; and a "flag day" in Germany, where flags are ordered to be shown by federal decree. Europe Day is also celebrated in Romania, where it coincides with the State Independence Day of Romania (Romania's independence day).

See also
 Symbols of the European Union
 Liberation Day
 Victory Day (9 May) - commemorates the day when the Nazis signed the German Instrument of Surrender to the Allied Expeditionary Force and the Red Army in Berlin, ending World War II in Europe.
 Commonwealth Day
 United Nations Day
 Africa Day
Mediterranean Day

References

External links

 The symbols of the EU – Europa
 Europe Day, 9 May 
 Declaration of 9 May 1950
 The Inter institutions website publishing all organized activities during these celebrations.

Day
Day
May observances
International organization days
1964 establishments in Europe
Recurring events disestablished in 1964
1985 establishments in Europe
 
Pan-Europeanism
German flag flying days

fi:Euroopan unionin symbolit#Eurooppa-päivä